The "cafeteria group" was an informal club at the University of Cambridge consisting of John Maynard Keynes, Frank P. Ramsey, Piero Sraffa and Ludwig Wittgenstein. The group discussed Keynes's theory of probability, particularly his 1921 A Treatise on Probability, and Friedrich Hayek's theory of business cycles.

See also
Austrian Theory of the Business Cycle
A Treatise on Probability
Keynesian economics
Probability theory

References

Clubs and societies of the University of Cambridge
History of economic thought